Foreglen ("The Outer Glenn") is a village in County Londonderry, Northern Ireland. Around 1900 it was known as Ballymoney.

Education
St Peter's and St Paul's Primary School

Sport
The local Gaelic Athletic Association club is O'Brien's GAC.

See also 
List of villages in Northern Ireland
List of towns in Northern Ireland

References 

Villages in County Londonderry
Causeway Coast and Glens district